Stacey Nelkin is an American film and television actress.

Career

Acting 
Nelkin starred as Bonnie Sue Chisholm in four episodes of the CBS western miniseries The Chisholms (1979). When the miniseries resumed in 1980, she was up for the role in the miniseries but turned it down to take a role as Candy on Up the Academy. Delta Burke starred in the role of Bonnie Sue instead of Stacey.

She appeared in the horror film Halloween III: Season of the Witch (1982) as Ellie Grimbridge.
Around the same time, Nelkin was scheduled to appear in the film Blade Runner. She had been cast as Mary, a sixth Nexus-6 replicant that escapes from "off-world" and comes to Earth, but budget constraints resulted in her part being cut from the film early in the period of principal photography. Before being cast as Mary, she had done a screen test for the role of Pris but the role ultimately went to Daryl Hannah.  Nelkin's screen test appears on Disc 4 of the collector's edition DVD set. Nelkin has made guest appearances in several TV series, including CHiPs, The A-Team, Eight Is Enough, 1st & Ten and Hunter.

Her best-known TV role was on the soap opera Generations (1990) as Christy Russell.

Relationship expert 

Nelkin is a self-styled "relationship expert" and has her own YouTube channel and a website. She wrote a book called You Can't Afford to Break Up: How an Empty Wallet and a Dirty Mind Can Save Your Relationship.  For a time, she was a frequent guest on the program Fox & Friends.

Substance abuse professional 

In 2008, Nelkin began a career in drama therapy and today is a substance abuse professional and Certified Alcohol and Substance Abuse Counselor (CASAC).

In February 2016, Nelkin began treating dually diagnosed individuals with mental health and substance abuse issues through the Office of Alcoholism and Substance Abuse Services Program (OASAS) at The Bridge, a New York-based $65 million agency that provides housing and behavioral health services to 3,200 New Yorkers annually. Since June 2016, she has served as an intake and CASAC counselor at The Bridge.

Personal life 
According to Nelkin, Woody Allen's film Manhattan (1979) was based on her romantic relationship with the director, whom she met when she was 16 on the set of Annie Hall. Her bit part in that film ended up on the cutting room floor, and their relationship began when she was 17 years old and a student at New York's Stuyvesant High School, and Allen was 42. Allen has said that they dated for a time, but that Nelkin was not underage.

Nelkin is currently married to Marco Greenberg, and was married to actor Barry Bostwick from 1987 to 1991.  She has been married three times. Nelkin is Jewish.

Filmography 

Source:

Film

Television

References

External links 

1959 births
Living people
20th-century American actresses
21st-century American actresses
Actresses from New York City
American film actresses
American soap opera actresses
American television actresses
Jewish American actresses
Stuyvesant High School alumni
21st-century American Jews